Guðni Ágústsson (born 9 April 1949) is an Icelandic former politician who was chairman of the Progressive Party from 2007 until 17 November 2008, when he unexpectedly resigned, both as chairman of his party and as MP. He was a member of the Althing 1987–2008, for the Southern Constituency from 1987 to 2003 and for the South Constituency since 2003. From 1999 to 2007, he was Minister of Agriculture.

References

Gudni Agustsson
1949 births
Living people
Gudni Agustsson